Siale Piutau (born 13 October 1985) is a New Zealand-born Tongan rugby union player who plays at centre.   Although born and educated in New Zealand, he represented Tonga internationally from 2011 to 2019. He is the elder brother of New Zealand player Charles Piutau.

Piutau was selected as Tonga's captain for the 2019 Rugby World Cup and announced his retirement from international rugby, after a win against the USA.

Playing career

Provincial Rugby

Piutau joined Counties Manukau during the 2006 Air New Zealand Cup. 

Lining up next to former All Black Tana Umaga in midfield, Piutau was in the 2010 ITM Cup for the Steelers. He started every game for Counties, and was one of the club's top performers over the course of the season. As a reward for his efforts, he was named the 2010 Counties Manukau Player of the Year.

Super Rugby

Piutau was included in the Chiefs Wider Training Group for the 2010 Super 14 season, and made his Super Rugby debut as a substitute late in the season after a rash of injuries hit the Chiefs backs.

For the 2011 Super 15 season, Piutau was signed by the Highlanders and emerged as a key squad member, making 13 starts and scoring 3 tries.
In 2012, he was limited by injuries and made only 5 appearances. Following the season, he left New Zealand to sign in Japan.

Japan

For the 2012–13 season, Piutau signed with Yamaha Jubilo of the Top League in Japan.

English Rugby

Wasps

He signed for Wasps RFC on 4 February 2016 for the remainder of the 2015/2016 season. He made his debut in the 64–23 victory over Saracens F.C. on 14 February 2016. After returning from his loan spell at Wasps, Piutau returned to Japan, and Yamaha Jubilo.

Bristol

Piutau signed for Bristol in the Greene King IPA Championship, initially on a short-term deal, which was later extended to a permanent contract, in December 2016.

Piutau became a regular starter at Centre and was known for his on and off field leadership. He played 66 times for Bristol and was present for the Bears' promotion to the Premiership in 2018 and in the successful European Challenge cup campaign in 2020. Piutau announced that he will leave Bristol at the conclusion of the 2020/2021 season.

Return to Japan
On 7 June 2021, Piutau left Bristol in England at the end of the 2020-21 season, as he returned to Japan to sign for Shimizu Koto Blue Sharks in the Japan Rugby League One competition.

International career

Piutau has 43 international caps for Tonga  and this includes 19 as captain. His first cap was in the 2011 27-12 defeat against Fiji where he made his debut off the bench.
His final game for Tonga was in the 31-19 victory in the Rugby World Cup pool C match against the USA in which Piutau scored a try and a later conversion.
His final figures in his international career were 6 tries, 1 conversion totalling 32 points.

References

External links
Counties Manukau profile

Living people
New Zealand rugby union players
Highlanders (rugby union) players
1985 births
Tonga international rugby union players
Chiefs (rugby union) players
Counties Manukau rugby union players
Shizuoka Blue Revs players
New Zealand expatriate rugby union players
Expatriate rugby union players in Japan
Expatriate rugby union players in England
New Zealand expatriate sportspeople in Japan
New Zealand sportspeople of Tongan descent
Rugby union players from Auckland
Wasps RFC players
New Zealand expatriate sportspeople in England
Bristol Bears players
Shimizu Koto Blue Sharks players
Rugby union centres
Tongan expatriate rugby union players
Tongan expatriate sportspeople in England
Tongan expatriate sportspeople in Japan